Klikawa (also: Bystra) is a river of Poland and Czech Republic, a tributary of the Metuje near Náchod. It flows through Lewin Kłodzki and Kudowa-Zdrój.

Rivers of Poland
Rivers of Lower Silesian Voivodeship
Rivers of the Hradec Králové Region
International rivers of Europe